Jacopo Sarto (born 15 July 1990) is a retired Italian rugby union player. His usual position was as a Flanker.

In 2014 he was named  Permit Player for Benetton and from 2014 to 2018 he played for Zebre.
From 2018 to 2022 he played for Colorno in Top12.	

After playing for Emerging Italy squad in 2014, in 2016 Sarto was named in the Italy squad. He represented Italy 3 times in official test matches.

References

External links
ESPN Profile
It's Rugby France Profile

1990 births
Living people
Italian rugby union players
Italy international rugby union players
Rugby union flankers
Rugby Colorno players